"Radiate" is a single by British rock band Enter Shikari. The song was first played on Zane Lowe's BBC Radio 1 show on the evening of 10 June 2013 and was his single of the week. The single peaked at #79 on the UK Singles Chart on 22 June 2013.

Music video
The music video was released on the band's official YouTube channel on 10 June. The video includes the band, who are handcuffed, with their guitars un-stringed, drums without skins and black bars over their eyes. The video contains the lyrics as an overlay and was directed by Joshua Halling.

Track listing

Band members
Roughton "Rou" Reynolds – lead vocals, synthesizer, keyboards, programming, guitar
Chris Batten – bass guitar, backing vocals
Liam "Rory" Clewlow – guitar, backing vocals
Rob Rolfe – drums, percussion, backing vocals

References

Enter Shikari songs
2013 singles
Wikipedia requested audio of songs
2013 songs